Jeanette Sandra Marie Pettersson (born 19 June 1956) is a retired Swedish swimmer who won a bronze medal at the 1974 European Aquatics Championships. She competed in the 100 m and 200 m breaststroke events at the 1972 Summer Olympics but was eliminated in the preliminaries.

References

External links
Jeanette Pettersson (Baldemark). Sveriges Olympiska Kommitté

1957 births
Swimmers at the 1972 Summer Olympics
Swedish female breaststroke swimmers
Living people
Olympic swimmers of Sweden
European Aquatics Championships medalists in swimming
Swimmers from Gothenburg
20th-century Swedish women
21st-century Swedish women